The Private Life of Louis XIV or Liselotte of the Palatinate (German: Liselotte von der Pfalz) is a 1935 German historical film directed by Carl Froelich and starring Renate Müller, Eugen Klöpfer and Maria Krahn. It was shot at the Tempelhof Studios in Berlin and premiered at the city's UFA-Palast am Zoo. The sets were designed by the art directors Walter Haag and Franz Schroedter. The film's English language release title is a reference to the hit British film The Private Life of Henry VIII (1933).

The film portrays the life of the Heidelberg-born Elizabeth Charlotte, Princess Palatine, who married into the French royal family during the reign of Louis XIV. She was also the subject of a 1966 biopic in which she was played by Heidelinde Weis.

Cast

References

Bibliography 
 Hake, Sabine. Popular Cinema of the Third Reich. University of Texas Press, 2001.

External links 
 

1935 films
1930s historical films
1930s biographical films
German historical films
German biographical films
Films of Nazi Germany
1930s German-language films
Films directed by Carl Froelich
Films set in the 17th century
Films set in France
Films set in Heidelberg
Films about Louis XIV
Tobis Film films
German black-and-white films
1930s German films